Forsyth County Courthouse may refer to:

Forsyth County Courthouse (Georgia), in Cumming, Georgia, behind the Cumming Bandstand 
Forsyth County Courthouse (North Carolina), in Winston-Salem, North Carolina

See also
Forsyth County (disambiguation)